Events in the year 1862 in Mexico.

Incumbents

President and Cabinet
President: Benito Juárez
Interior Secretary (SEGOB):

Governors
 Aguascalientes: José Ma. Chávez Alonso
 Campeche: Pablo García Montilla
 Chiapas: Juan Clímaco Corzo/José Gabriel Esquinca
 Chihuahua: 
 Coahuila: Santiago Vidaurri
 Colima: Urbano Gómez/Salvador Brihuega/Manuel F. Toro/Florencio Villareal/Manuel F. Toro/Julio Garcia/Ramón R. De la Vega
 Durango:  
 Guanajuato: 
 Guerrero: 
 Jalisco: Ignacio Luis Vallarta/Pedro Ogazón/Manuel Doblado/Jesús López Portillo
 State of Mexico:  
 Michoacán: 
 Nuevo León: Santiago Vidaurri
 Oaxaca: 
 Puebla: 
 Querétaro: Zeferino Macías/Zeferino Macías/Ignacio Echegaray/José Linares/José María Arteaga
 San Luis Potosí: 
 Sinaloa: 
 Sonora: 
 Tabasco: 
 Tamaulipas: Jesús de la Serna/Ignacio Comonfort/Albino López/Juan B. Troconis	 
 Veracruz: Ignacio de la Llave y Segura Zevallos
 Yucatán: 
 Zacatecas:

Events
April 19 – Battle of Fortín
April 28 – Battle of Las Cumbres
May 4 – Battle of Atlixco
May 5 – Battle of Puebla
May 18 – Battle of Barranca Seca
June 13 – Battle of Cerro del Borrego.

Births

Deaths
March 23 – Manuel Robles Pezuela
September 8 – Ignacio Zaragoza

References

External links
French Intervention in Mexico: Battle of Puebla

 
Years of the 19th century in Mexico